Tiempo de perdón is a 1969 Mexican telenovela produced by Televisa and originally transmitted on Telesistema Mexicano.

Cast 
Héctor Andremar
Eduardo Castell
Malena Doria
Enriqueta Lara

References

External links 

Mexican telenovelas
Televisa telenovelas
Spanish-language telenovelas
1968 telenovelas
1968 Mexican television series debuts
1968 Mexican television series endings